The Gladiator is a 1938 American comedy and fantasy film starring Joe E. Brown, Dickie Moore and June Travis. The movie is an adaptation of Philip Gordon Wylie's 1930 novel Gladiator, which is often credited with having influenced the creation of Superman.

Plot
A man returns to college and is talked into joining the football team. He is a real joke on the team, until he is given a drug that gives him super strength.

After the formula from Professor Danner turns him into a campus hero, Hugo Kipp enters a wrestling ring against Man Mountain Dean to raise money for an orphanage. He finds out too late that the serum is only temporary, losing his strength with the match in progress. Only a few lucky moves enable Hugo to win the match.

Cast
Main cast
Joe E. Brown - Hugo Kipp
Dickie Moore - Bobby
Man Mountain Dean - Himself
June Travis - Iris Bennett
Lucien Littlefield - Professor Danner
Ethel Wales - Mrs. Danner
Robert Kent - Tom Dixon
Donald Douglas - Coach Robbins
Uncredited appearances
Richard Alexander - Tough Guy
William Gould - Professor
Harrison Greene - Trophy Giver/Jokester
Sam Hayes - Announcer
Eddie Kane - Speed Burns
Marjorie Kane - Miss Taylor, Student
Milton Kibbee - Assistant Coach
Wright Kramer - Dr. DeRay
Edward LeSaint - Committee Member
Frank Mills - Man in Movie Audience
Jack Mulhall - Spectator at Wrestling Match
Lee Phelps - Coach Stetson
Harry Semels - Hamburger Man
John Shelton - Student
Charles Sullivan - Football Fan
Charles C. Wilson - Theatre Manager
Robert Winkler

Production
The movie reached theatres two months after the publication of the first appearance of Superman in a comic book.

References

External links

1938 films
Films directed by Edward Sedgwick
American black-and-white films
1930s English-language films
1938 comedy films
American comedy films
Films produced by David L. Loew
Columbia Pictures films
Films based on American novels
Films based on science fiction novels
Films based on works by Philip Wylie
1930s American films